Marius Bâtfoi (born 29 May 1990 in Buftea, Romania) is a Romanian football player who plays as a striker.

Career
While playing for Steaua II București, Marius was loaned out to Unirea Urziceni. He made his Liga I debut on 11 September 2010, in a match against Steaua București, coming off the bench to replace Apostol Muzac in the 90th minute.

References

External links
 
 

1990 births
Living people
People from Buftea
Romanian footballers
Association football forwards
Liga I players
Liga II players
I liga players
FC Steaua II București players
FC Unirea Urziceni players
CS Otopeni players
FCM Dunărea Galați players
LPS HD Clinceni players
Flota Świnoujście players
CS Balotești players
ASA 2013 Târgu Mureș players
AFC Chindia Târgoviște players
CSA Steaua București footballers
AS Voința Snagov players
Romanian expatriate footballers
Expatriate footballers in Poland
Romanian expatriate sportspeople in Poland